Morrell's Brewing Company, also known as the Lion Brewery, was the only major brewery in Oxford, England. It operated between 1782 and 1998.

Early history

Morrell's was founded by Richard Tawney in 1743 as the Lion Brewery. In 1782 he formed a partnership with Mark and James Morrell, who eventually became the owners. 1863 and 1864 saw the deaths of James Morrell and his wife Alicia leaving the brewery to their ten year old daughter Emily Morrell. Her inheritance was put under the control of three trustees who tried to deal with Emily's crush on a distant cousin by sending her away to an aunt and forbidding any communication between the pair.

Morrell's brewed its beers at the Lion Brewery in St Thomas Street. In the 19th century Morrell's redeveloped and extended the Lion Brewery a number of times. A large brewing shed was added in 1879, a blacksmith's shop and engine house in 1880, a further shed and new yard in 1882, stables in 1889, new offices in 1892, a tun room in 1895, further offices in 1897 and a tall octagonal chimney in 1901. All these developments were designed by the local architect Harry Drinkwater, who also designed a number of the company's pubs.

The Lion Brewery was powered by a waterwheel on Castle Mill Stream, a branch of the River Thames. This was supplemented by steam engines for which the engine house was built. One rotative beam engine that was built for the Lion Brewery in about 1826 remained in service until 1964 and is now preserved at the Abbey Pumping Station, Leicester.

The Morrell family lived at Headington Hill Hall and their estate included South Park. The family included Philip Morrell (1870–1943), who was a Liberal MP 1906–18 and was married to Lady Ottoline Morrell. In 1929–31 Morrell Avenue was built along the south side of South Park. The family also owned the village of Streatley and one side of the family lived there, until Emily Morrell died in 1938, when the estate was sold.

After an acrimonious family dispute the brewery was closed in 1998. Refresh UK bought the beer brands and for a time Thomas Hardy Burtonwood was contracted to brew them. Marston's acquired Refresh UK in 2008 and now brew Morrells beers.

Post-brewing operations

In 1998 Michael Cannon, owner of the US hamburger chain Fuddruckers, bought Morrell's 132 tied pubs for £48 million through a new company, Morrells of Oxford. In 2002 Cannon sold 107 of the pubs to Greene King for £67 million.

Development of the Lion Brewery site

The Lion Brewery site was redeveloped for luxury apartments in 2002. The waterwheel and yellow brick chimney were retained but only the façades were retained of the other buildings.

References

Sources and further reading

External links

1743 establishments in England
1998 disestablishments in England

British companies established in 1782

British companies disestablished in 1998
Companies based in Oxford
Defunct breweries of the United Kingdom
History of Oxford
1782 establishments in England
Food and drink companies established in 1782